Henry of Navarre may refer to:
Henry I of Navarre, reigned 1270–74
Henry II of Navarre, reigned 1517–55
Henry IV of France, also Henry III of Navarre, reigned 1572–1610
Henry of Navarre (horse), a racehorse